Mons-en-Pévèle is a commune in the Nord department in northern France.

Heraldry

See also
Communes of the Nord department
 Battle of Mons-en-Pévèle (1304)

References

External links
 Official website

Monsenpevele
French Flanders